Zeebroeck Castle is a castle in Nethen, Wallonia in the municipality of Grez-Doiceau, in the province of Walloon Brabant, Belgium.

See also
List of castles in Belgium

References 

Castles in Belgium
Castles in Walloon Brabant
Grez-Doiceau